Oliver ("Olly") Thomas Flynn (born 30 June 1950 in Ipswich, Suffolk) is a retired male race walker from England.

Athletics career
Flynn represented Great Britain at the 1976 Olympic Games. He represented England and won a gold medal in the 30 kilometres walk event, at the 1978 Commonwealth Games in Edmonton, Alberta, Canada.

International competitions

References

1950 births
Living people
Sportspeople from Ipswich
English male racewalkers
British male racewalkers
Olympic athletes of Great Britain
Athletes (track and field) at the 1976 Summer Olympics
Commonwealth Games gold medallists for England
Commonwealth Games medallists in athletics
Athletes (track and field) at the 1978 Commonwealth Games
Medallists at the 1978 Commonwealth Games